Saint Patrick's College may refer to:

Australia 
 St Patrick's College, Ballarat, Victoria
 St Patrick's College, Campbelltown, New South Wales
 St Patrick's College, East Melbourne, Victoria
 St Patrick's College, Goulburn, New South Wales (closed 2000)
 St Patrick's College, Gympie, Queensland
 St Patrick's College, Launceston, Tasmania
 St Patrick's College, Mackay, Queensland
 St Patrick's College, Manly, a seminary in New South Wales
 St Patrick's College, Shorncliffe, Brisbane, Queensland
 St Patrick's College, Strathfield, New South Wales
 St Patrick's College, Sutherland, New South Wales
 St Patrick's College, Townsville, Queensland
 St Patrick's Technical College, Edinburgh North, South Australia

Ireland 
 St. Patrick's, Carlow College, a third level college
 St Patrick's College, Cavan, an all-male secondary school
 St Patrick's College, Dublin, a former teacher training college affiliated to Dublin City University
 Coláiste Phádraig (Lucan), a secondary school for boys in County Dublin
 St Patrick's College, Maynooth, a pontifical university and national seminary
 St. Patrick's College, Thurles, a teacher training college affiliated to University of Limerick
 St. Patrick's College, Tuam, a former secondary school for boys in County Galway

United Kingdom 
 St Patrick's College, Armagh, now part of St Patrick's Grammar School
 St Patrick's College, Belfast, a former secondary school
 St. Patrick's College, Dungannon, a voluntary grammar school in County Tyrone
 St. Patrick's College, Knock, a Roman Catholic diocesan grammar school in Belfast
 St Patrick's College, Maghera, County Londonderry
 St Patrick's College, London, a private higher education college at Tower Hill
 St Patrick's Catholic College, Thornaby-on-Tees,  North Yorkshire
 St Patrick's and St Brigid's College, Claudy, County Londonderry

Other countries 

 St. Patrick's College (Ottawa), a former part of Carleton University, Canada
 St. Patrick's College, Silverstream, Upper Hutt, New Zealand
 St. Patrick's College, Wellington, New Zealand
 St. Patrick's College (Karachi), affiliated with the University of Karachi, Pakistan
 St. Patrick's College, South Africa, a co-educational boarding school in Kokstad, KwaZulu Natal
 St. Patrick's College, Jaffna, a private school in Gurunagar, Sri Lanka

See also
 St. Patrick's High School (disambiguation)
 St. Patrick's School (disambiguation)
 St. Patrick's (disambiguation)